Onoz is a village of Wallonia and a district of the municipality of Jemeppe-sur-Sambre, located in the province of Namur, Belgium. 

It is located on the west bank of the river Orneau

References

External links

 — Church of Saint-Martin of Onoz

Former municipalities of Namur (province)
Battle of Ligny locations